

Leeson Street is a thoroughfare near central Dublin, Ireland.

Location 
The street is divided into two parts by the Grand Canal: Lower Leeson Street, in Dublin 2 is to the north of the canal, linking to St Stephen's Green, with Upper Leeson Street, in the Dublin 4 region, south of the canal.

History 
Originally known as Suesy Street, it was renamed in 1728 after the Leesons, a family of local brewers, who branched into property development and subsequently became Earls of Milltown. In 1769 a Magdalen Asylum was established by Lady Arabella Denny in the street for Protestant women.

The street is home to several prominent buildings including the main office of the Ombudsman and the embassies of Portugal, Malta, Palestine and Cyprus. The largest building on Lower Leeson Street, along with several adjoining buildings and significant land holdings in the area, is owned by the Catholic University School.

In 1990, Caravaggio's lost masterpiece, The Taking of Christ, was recognised in the residence of the Jesuit Communication Centre on Lower Leeson Street. Broadcaster Gerry Ryan lived and died on this street.

There were formerly streetwalkers along the canal district in Dublin.

Gallery

See also
 Georgian Dublin
 Joseph Leeson, 1st Earl of Milltown
 List of streets and squares in Dublin

References

External links
 TripAdvisor review on the area

Streets in Dublin (city)
Historical red-light districts in the Republic of Ireland
St Stephen's Green